Altierus Career College is a postsecondary non-profit healthcare and trade school owned by ECMC Education. The school has campuses in Tampa, Florida; Norcross, Georgia; and Houston, Texas; and offers certificates and associate degrees. The school is nationally accredited by the Accrediting Commission of Career Schools and Colleges.

History 
The schools were once part of Corinthian Colleges, a now defunct large for-profit college chain that collapsed in 2015. Educational Credit Management Corporation (ECMC) took over the schools in 2015 under the name Zenith Education and rebranded them as Alterius Career Colleges. More than 20 Zenith campuses closed in 2017, leaving only three campuses in service.   As of April 2022, ECMC Group announced the remaining three campuses would be closing.

See also
Corinthian Colleges
 Educational Credit Management Corporation

References

External links 
 

Universities and colleges in Florida
Tampa, Florida
Universities and colleges in Georgia (U.S. state)
Universities and colleges in Houston